The Institute for National Defense and Security Research (INDSR) is a Taiwanese think tank based in Taipei. The Institute’s mission is to safeguard Taiwan's democracy and prosperity by strengthening mutual understanding and advancing common interests in the global and Taiwanese defense and security community. The institute is operated under the auspices of the government and the Legislative Yuan and has a NT$125 million (US$4.2 million) annual budget.

It is considered to be the top military think tank in Taiwan. While it receives almost all of its funding from government sources INDSR is institutionally independent, nonpartisan, and nonprofit.

History
The Institute for National Defense and Security Research was inaugurated in May 2018 by Taiwanese President Tsai Ing-wen, former minister of national defense Feng Shih-kuan and representatives from government, industry, academia, and civil society. It was founded with seven research departments, one research center, and 64 employees. To start the Institute hired 17 researchers (all with PhDs) and 17 research assistants.

Organization
 Division of National Security and Decision-Making
 Division of National Defense Strategies and Policies
 Division of Chinese Politics and Military Affairs
 Division of Non-traditional Security and Military Missions
 Division of Cyber Warfare and Information Security
 Division of Advanced Technologies and Warfighting Concepts
 Division of National Defense Resources and Industries
 Center for Quantitative Analysis and Decision-Making Simulation
 Administration

Publications

Defense Security Brief
The Defense Security Brief (DSB) (國防安全) is an English language publication focused on security and military affairs. It was founded in 2011 and was compiled and published by the Office of Defense Studies, Ministry of National Defense until it was transferred to INDSR in 2018.

Defense Strategy and Assessment Journal
The Defense Strategy and Assessment Journal (戰略與評估) is a quarterly Chinese-language journal for defense and security research.

Defense Situation Monthly
The Defense Situation Monthly (國防情勢月報) is a monthly newsletter authored by INDSR experts.

Defense Security Weekly
The Defense Security Weekly(國防安全週報) is a weekly newsletter offering longer-form analysis by INDSR experts about news, security issues and trends of the preceding week. Distributed internally to government agencies and lawmakers.

Defense Security News
The Defense Security News (國防安全新聞) is a daily that focuses on global headlines and developments concerning China. Distributed internally to government agencies and lawmakers.

See also
Center for Strategic and International Studies
RAND Corporation
European Centre of Excellence for Countering Hybrid Threats

References

External links 

 

Think tanks based in Taiwan
Foreign policy and strategy think tanks
2018 establishments in Taiwan
Organizations based in Taipei
Think tanks established in 2018